Standard Dwight "Stan" Lambert (born December 21, 1952), is an American bank executive who is a Republican member of the Texas House of Representatives for the 71st District, which encompasses Jones, Nolan, and Taylor counties about Abilene. Lambert was sworn into the Texas House on January 10, 2017, after he won the general election held on November 8, 2016.

Lambert was previously a member of the board of directors of the Abilene Independent School District.

In the general election held on November 6, 2018, Lambert won his second House term. With 38,430 votes (70.1 percent), he defeated the Democratic candidate, Sam Hatton, who polled 10,792 21.9 percent).

References

External links
 Campaign website
 State legislative page
 Stan Lambert at the Texas Tribune

1952 births
Living people
21st-century American politicians
Republican Party members of the Texas House of Representatives
Abilene Christian Wildcats athletic directors
Abilene Christian University alumni
Southern Methodist University alumni
People from Abilene, Texas
School board members in Texas